Georges-Alain Jones (30 September 1975, Saint-Jean-Cap-Ferrat, Alpes-Maritimes) is a French former singer. He participated in the second edition of French TV reality show Star Academy. His debut single "Embrasse" was a top ten hit in France and Belgium (Wallonia).

Discography

Albums
 2005 : New Jersey - #75 in Belgium, #31 in France

Singles
 2003 : "Embrasse" - #4 in Belgium, #6 in France, #26 in Switzerland
 2003 : "Vivre en danger" - #40 in Belgium, #55 in France
 2005 : "Central Park" - #36 in France

References

External links

1975 births
Living people
People from Alpes-Maritimes
French pop singers
Star Academy (France) participants
21st-century French singers
21st-century French male singers